Ram Moav (1930 - 1984) was an Israeli geneticist and science fiction writer. He is best known as a key figure in early Israeli science fiction, and as the author of the controversial novel Luna (see below), which depicts a genetic utopia on the moon. He has been cited as an early childhood read and influence by author Lavie Tidhar, amongst others.

Novels 

 Zirmat Chachamim (Genes for Geniuses, Inc.)
 Luna: Gan Ha'eden Hageneti (Luna: The Genetic Paradise)

External links
 Luna: The Genetic Paradise, an article by Lavie Tidhar

1930 births
1984 deaths